Aert van Tricht was a Dutch metal-caster who was active in Maastricht between 1492 and 1501, in Antwerp in 1521 (?). He is sometimes called Aert van Tricht the Elder to distinguish him from his son. His known works include the following:

 Seven-branched candelabra for the Franciscan monastery in Maastricht, 1492, now lost
 Brass font for St. John's Cathedral in 's-Hertogenbosch, 1492
 Copper railings for the Brotherhood Chapel of St. John's Cathedral in 's-Hertogenbosch, based on wooden models made by Alart du Hameel, 1495-6
 Eagle lectern, originally in St. Peter's Church, Leuven, now in The Cloisters, New York City, c. 1500
 Arched candelabrum used as a choir screen of Xanten Cathedral, 1501
 Bronze tabernacle in Bocholt Church in Bocholt, Belgium, undated
 Brass font, originally in St Nicolas'Church in Maastricht, now in the Basilica of Our Lady, Maastricht, undated and severely damaged (stripped of all ornaments)

References
 Crab, Jan and F. Lenaerts, The Great Copper Pelican in the Choir: The Lectern from the Church of St. Peter in Louvain, The Metropolitan Museum of Art Bulletin, Vol. 26, No. 10 (Jun., 1968), pp. 401–406.
Aert van Tricht at the Netherlands Institute for Art History

15th-century births
1550s deaths
Early Netherlandish sculptors
Dutch male sculptors
People from Maastricht
Metalworkers